The Classical Pops Festival is an annual outdoor festival on Barbados that takes place every December at the Apes Hill Club. It is the first of its kind for Barbados and the Caribbean, heavily influenced by Tanglewood in Massachusetts and the BBC Proms in the UK. It is also noted for comprising an all-star orchestra made up of principal players and members of some of the world's most prestigious symphonies.

In 2014, the festival orchestra was conducted by Thomas Wilkins, Principal Conductor of the Hollywood Bowl Orchestra, Music Director of the Omaha Symphony, and Germeshausen Family and Youth Concert Conductor chair with the Boston Symphony Orchestra (BSO). The orchestra had four concertmasters performing together, something he had never known to happen before. Jonathon Crow, Concertmaster of the Toronto Symphony Orchestra served as the official festival concertmaster.

The orchestra was also recognized as uniquely diverse, with some of classical music's most accomplished African American players, including Ann Hobson Pilot, the legendary principal harpist for the Boston Symphony Orchestra; Owen Young, also of the BSO; and Terrance Patterson, Artistic Director of the Ritz Chamber Players.

Besides classical music, the festival programs contemporary music, jazz, opera, film scores, and Broadway tunes performed by popular artists with orchestra. Guest ensembles complete the festival lineup. In 2014, Irvin Mayfield & the New Orleans Jazz Orchestra opened the festival with special guest Alison Hinds, followed by the orchestra performing Film Night, which showcased the music of John Williams, Hans Zimmer, Henry Mancini, Jerry Goldsmith, and Erich Wolfgang Korngold and featured acclaimed violinist Tai Murray as a soloist. The second day of the festival began with the Piazzolla Trio with dancer Lil Buck, followed by the orchestra performing Holiday Pops! with soprano Alison Buchanan, the St. Leonard's Boy's Choir, and the Gospelfest Choir. CNN shot Ones to Watch at the festival, which helped catapult  Lil Buck to international stardom.

References

Music festivals in Barbados
Classical music festivals in Barbados
Music festivals established in 2014
Winter events in Barbados